Little Johnny Jones is a lost 1923 American comedy film directed by Johnny Hines and Arthur Rosson and written by Raymond L. Schrock based on the 1904 play Little Johnny Jones by George M. Cohan. The film stars Johnny Hines, Wyndham Standing, Margaret Seddon, Herbert Prior, Molly Malone, and George Webb. The film was released by Warner Bros. on August 19, 1923. It was remade by Warner Bros. and directed by cast member Mervyn LeRoy in 1929 as a musical film under the same name.

Cast    
Johnny Hines as Johnny Jones
Wyndham Standing as The Earl of Bloomsburg
Margaret Seddon as Mrs. Jones
Herbert Prior as Sir James Smythe
Molly Malone as Edith Smythe
George Webb as Robert Arnstead
Pauline French as Lady Jane Smythe
Mervyn LeRoy as George Nelson, Jockey
Nat Carr
Brownie the Wonder Dog
Harry Myers as The Chauffeur
Spec O'Donnell as Freckle faced Little Boy
Maxine Tabnac as Little Girl

Box office
According to Warner Bros records the film earned $296,000 domestically and $30,000 foreign.

References

External links

Stills at silenthollywood.com

1923 films
1920s English-language films
Silent American comedy films
1923 comedy films
Warner Bros. films
Films directed by Arthur Rosson
Lost American films
American silent feature films
American black-and-white films
1923 lost films
Lost comedy films
1920s American films